Chief Wabakinine (before 1780–August 1796), also spelled Wabacoming, Wabicanine, or Waipykanine, was a Mississauga chief and warrior.

Life 
By the mid-1790s, Wabakinine was the head chief of all the Mississaugas along the western coast of Lake Ontario. He was a signatory on many early land surrenders in Upper Canada, including the Niagara Purchase of 1781, another agreement in 1784 for the lands surrounding Lake Ontario, and a 1795 document granting another 3,500 acres to The Crown.

Death 
In 1796 after travelling to York, Upper Canada to sell salmon, Wabakinine camped with his band on the peninsula. In the middle of the night, a member of the Queen's York Rangers, Private Charles McEwan (or McCuen), accompanied by two other men, attempted to pull Wabakinine's sister from her bed. Earlier that evening, McEwan had offered her rum and a dollar to sleep with him. Intoxicated, Wabakinine tried to defend his sister before he was viciously beaten with a rock by McEwan. The men proceeded to beat Wabakinine's wife leaving them both with fatal injuries near what is now St. Lawrence Market. Wabakinine died the following day and his wife the day after.

Aftermath 
A peacemaker and leader of a large band of Mississaugas, Wabakinine's death greatly increased the already rising tensions between colonial officials and First Nations in Upper Canada. The Mississaugas prepared to retaliate, visiting Joseph Brant to request support from his much larger band of Iroquoian warriors. Brant however, familiar with the British's military size and firepower, dissuaded the Mississaugas from pursuing revenge.

McEwan was detained and was allowed to flee Upper Canada thus evading trial relating to the death of Wabakinine.

References

18th-century births
1796 deaths
Year of birth unknown
Mississauga people